Country Fuzz is the fourth studio album by American country band The Cadillac Three. It was released on February 7, 2020 under Big Machine Records.

Critical reception

Country Fuzz was met with generally favorable reviews from critics. At Metacritic, which assigns a weighted average rating out of 100 to reviews from mainstream publications, this release received an average score of 79, based on 4 reviews.

Commercial performance
The album has sold 5,900 copies in the United States as of March 2020. It debuted at No. 17 on Billboard's Top Country Albums on February 22, 2020. On 14 February 2020, the album debuted at No. 1 on the UK Country Albums.

Track listing

Personnel
Adapted from AllMusic

The Cadillac Three
Kelby Ray Caldwell - dobro, lap steel guitar
Jaren Johnston - banjo, bass guitar, beat box, dobro, acoustic guitar, electric guitar, resonator guitar, percussion, programming, lead vocals, background vocals
Neil Mason - clapping, drums, percussion, programming

Additional Musicians
Dann Huff - bouzouki, resonator guitar, mandolin, piano, programming, tambourine
Chris Janson - harmonica and vocals on "Hard Out Here for a Country Boy"
Justin Niebank - programming
F. Reid Shippen - programming
Travis Tritt - vocals on "Hard Out Here for a Country Boy"
Alex Wright - banjo, Hammond B-3 organ

Charts

References

2020 albums
The Cadillac Three albums
Big Machine Records albums